The Monti Sibillini National Park is an Italian national park located across the regions of Marche and Umbria, encompassing the provinces of Macerata, Fermo, Ascoli Piceno and Perugia.

It was established in 1993, and now contains more than 70,000 hectares.

References

External links
Official website
Pages by the Park Authority on Parks.it
Information on walks in the park

Monti Sibillini
Parks in Umbria
Parks in Marche
Protected areas established in 1993
Protected areas of the Apennines